The 2019–20 Premier League was a professional association football league season in England.

2019–20 Premier League may also refer to:

Association football
 2019–20 Armenian Premier League
 2019–20 Azerbaijan Premier League
 2019–20 Dhivehi Premier League
 2019–20 Premier League of Belize
 2019–20 Premier League of Bosnia and Herzegovina
 2019–20 Egyptian Premier League
 2019–20 Hong Kong Premier League
 2019–20 I-League
 2019–20 Iraqi Premier League
 2019–20 Israeli Premier League
 2019–20 Kuwait Premier League
 2019–20 Lebanese Premier League
 2019–20 Maltese Premier League
 2019–20 National Premier League (Jamaica)
 2019–20 Russian Premier League
 2019–20 Syrian Premier League
 2019–20 Tanzanian Premier League
 2019–20 Ukrainian Premier League
 2019–20 Welsh Premier League

Basketball
 2019–20 Belarusian Premier League
 2019–20 Israeli Basketball Premier League

Cricket
2019–20 Bangladesh Premier League
2020 Indian Premier League
2019–20 Premier League Tournament (Sri Lanka)

See also
 2019–20 Premier League International Cup